Jekwu Anyaegbuna is a Nigerian writer and poet. He was the first story writer from Nigeria to win the Commonwealth Short Story Prize in 2012. His stories have been published in several notable literary journals in the United States and the UK.

Education and career
Anyaegbuna graduated from the University of Ilorin. Writing a short story "Morrison Okoli (1955–2010)", he was shortlisted for the Africa regional Commonwealth Short Story Prize and finally received it in May 2012.

In 2017,  Anyaegbuna received a scholarship from the University of East Anglia (UEA) to study creative writing (MA Prose Fiction).

Books
 The Swimming Pool (2013)

Awards

References

Year of birth missing (living people)
Living people
Nigerian writers
21st-century Nigerian poets
Alumni of the University of East Anglia